Grétar Ólafur Hjartarson (born 26 November 1977 in Sandgerði, Iceland) is an Icelandic former football player who last played for Reynir S.

External links
 
 
 

1977 births
Living people
Gretar Hjartarson
Gretar Hjartarson
Gretar Hjartarson
Stirling Albion F.C. players
Lillestrøm SK players
Landskrona BoIS players
Gretar Hjartarson
Gretar Hjartarson
Scottish Football League players
Eliteserien players
Gretar Hjartarson
Expatriate footballers in Norway
Expatriate footballers in Scotland
Association football forwards
Gretar Hjartarson
Gretar Hjartarson